Papilio bachus is a butterfly of the family Papilionidae. It is found in South America, including Colombia, Ecuador, Peru, and Bolivia.

Some authors consider it to be a subspecies of Papilio zagreus.

The wingspan is 110–130 mm.

Subspecies
There are two recognised subspecies:
Papilio bachus belsazar Niepelt, 1908 
Papilio bachus chrysomelus Rothschild & Jordan, 1906

References
Lewis, H. L., 1974 Butterflies of the World  Page 24, figure 13.

External links
Papilio bachus, ButterflyCorner.net

bachus
Papilionidae of South America
Butterflies described in 1865